Camila Rebeca Morrone Polak (born June 16, 1997) is an American model and actress. She made her acting debut in the James Franco film Bukowski and subsequently appeared in the films Death Wish and Never Goin' Back, both premiering at the Sundance Film Festival in January 2018.

Early life and education
Morrone was born in Los Angeles, California, to Argentine actors Maximo Morrone and Lucila Polak (who goes by the stage name Lucila Solá). They moved to Los Angeles shortly before Morrone's birth, and divorced in 2006. Morrone graduated from Beverly Hills High School in 2015. Her maternal grand-aunt is Argentine-British pathologist Julia Polak. Her mother is half Slovenian.

Career

Modeling
She started her career as a model and appeared on the cover page of the Turkish edition of Vogue in 2016. She made her runway debut modeling for Moschino's 2017 resort collection.

Acting
Morrone made her acting debut in James Franco's 2013 film Bukowski. In 2018, she returned to acting in the action film Death Wish, and co-starred in Augustine Frizzell's directorial debut Never Goin' Back. The latter film premiered at the 2018 Sundance Film Festival and was released by A24. After being cast in Daisy Jones & The Six, Morrone indicated that she would focus her career on acting rather than modeling.

On October 18, 2019, Morrone received the Rising Star Award at the San Diego International Film Festival.

Personal life
Morrone was in a relationship with actor Leonardo DiCaprio for five years until 2022.

Filmography

Film

Television

Awards and nominations

References

External links 
 
 
 

1997 births
Living people
21st-century American actresses
Actresses from Los Angeles
American film actresses
American people of Argentine descent
Beverly Hills High School alumni
Female models from California
Hispanic and Latino American actresses
Hispanic and Latino American female models
IMG Models models
Models from Los Angeles